Lickliter is a surname. Notable people with the surname include:

 Frank Lickliter (born 1969), American golfer
 Robert Lickliter, American psychologist and professor
 Todd Lickliter (born 1955), American basketball coach